Neurofascin is a protein that in humans is encoded by the NFASC gene.

Function 

Neurofascin is an L1 family immunoglobulin cell adhesion molecule (see L1CAM) involved in axon subcellular targeting and synapse formation during neural development.

Clinical importance

A homozygous mutation causing loss of Nfasc155 causes severe congenital hypotonia, contractures of fingers and toes and no reaction to touch or pain.

References

Further reading 

 
 
 
 
 
 
 
 
 
 
 
 
 

Human proteins